German submarine U-608 was a Type VIIC U-boat of Nazi Germany's Kriegsmarine during World War II. During the Battle of the Atlantic, she was commanded by Kapitänleutnant Rolf Struckmeier as a unit of Wolfpack Vorwärts.

She was scuttled in the Bay of Biscay on 10 August 1944 after being attacked by a RAF Liberator aircraft with depth charges.

Design
German Type VIIC submarines were preceded by the shorter Type VIIB submarines. U-608 had a displacement of  when at the surface and  while submerged. She had two shafts and two  propellers.

U-608 was fitted with five  torpedo tubes (four fitted at the bow and one at the stern), fourteen torpedoes, one  SK C/35 naval gun, 220 rounds, and a  C/30 anti-aircraft gun. The boat had a complement of between forty-four and sixty.

Fate
She was scuttled in the Bay of Biscay on 10 August 1944 after being attacked by a RAF Liberator aircraft with depth charges. The damaged boat surfaced unnoticed and was scuttled by her crew, which was rescued by  six hours later suffering no losses.

Wolfpacks
U-608 took part in 19 wolfpacks, namely:
 Stier (29 August – 2 September 1942)
 Vorwärts (2 – 15 September 1942)
 Pfeil (1 – 9 February 1943)
 Neptun (18 February – 3 March 1943)
 Neuland (8 – 13 March 1943)
 Dränger (14 – 20 March 1943) 
 Trutz (1 – 16 June 1943)
 Trutz 1 (16 – 29 June 1943)
 Geier 1 (30 June – 15 July 1943)
 Schlieffen (14 – 22 October 1943)
 Siegfried (22 – 27 October 1943)
 Siegfried 1 (27 – 30 October 1943)
 Jahn (31 October – 2 November 1943)
 Tirpitz 2 (2 – 8 November 1943)
 Eisenhart 7 (9 – 11 November 1943)
 Schill 2 (17 – 22 November 1943) 
 Igel 2 (9 – 17 February 1944) 
 Hai 1 (17 – 22 February 1944) 
 Preussen (22 February – 14 March 1944)

Summary of raiding history

References

Notes

Citations

Bibliography

External links

 U-608 at wrecksite.eu

German Type VIIC submarines
U-boats commissioned in 1942
U-boats sunk in 1944
U-boats sunk by depth charges
U-boats sunk by British aircraft
World War II submarines of Germany
1941 ships
Ships built in Hamburg
World War II shipwrecks in the Atlantic Ocean
Maritime incidents in August 1944